Anatoly Petrovich Bykov (born 17 January 1960) is a Russian businessman and politician. During the 1990s, Bykov gained prominence in Krasnoyarsk Krai and Krasnoyarsk as an entrepreneur, who was the chairman of the board of the world's largest aluminium company RUSAL's Krasnoyarsk aluminum plant (KrAZ).

Political activity 
Bykov is considered one of the most powerful persons in Krasnoyarsk. Bykov from 1997 until 2016 held a seat of the deputy of the Legislative Assembly of Krasnoyarsk Krai and his party Patriots of Russia is currently holding 14 (or 25.62%) of the 36 seats in the Krasnoyarsk City Council of Deputies, leaving Vladimir's Putin ruling party United Russia behind with 12 seats.

Controversies 
Bykov was a strong supporter of Alexander Lebed.

In 2002, Bykov received a suspended prison sentence of  years for plotting the murder of a former associate. The case was under review by the European Court of Human Rights in Strasbourg, following an application lodged by Bykov. In 2009, it has ruled that Russian authorities violated the rights of Bykov and awarded him about $33,000 in compensation.

In May 2020, Bykov was arrested in Krasnoyarsk, on suspicion of organizing the 1994 murders of criminal gang members Kirill Voytenko and Alexander Naumov. In September 2021, he was sentenced to 13 years of imprisonment.

References 

1960 births
Living people
People from Nazarovo
Russian politicians
Russian crime bosses
European Court of Human Rights cases involving Russia